Sipha is a genus of true bugs belonging to the family Aphididae.

The genus has almost cosmopolitan distribution.

Species:
 Sipha aegilopis Bozhko, 1961 
 Sipha agropyronensis (Gillette, 1911)

References

Aphididae